Oleg Vladimirovich Musin (born 12 January 1975) is a Kazakhstani former professional footballer.  He also holds Russian citizenship.

Club career
Musin made his debut in the Russian Premier League in 2001 for FC Sokol Saratov.

Honours
 Kazakhstan Premier League runner-up: 2006.

References

Kazakhstani footballers
Kazakhstani expatriate footballers
Kazakhstan international footballers
FC Dynamo Barnaul players
FC Sokol Saratov players
FC Aktobe players
FC Kairat players
1975 births
People from Gorno-Altaysk
Living people
Expatriate footballers in Russia
Russian Premier League players
FC Metallurg Lipetsk players
FC SKA-Khabarovsk players
FC Vityaz Podolsk players
Association football defenders
FC Novokuznetsk players
FC Dynamo Bryansk players
FC MVD Rossii Moscow players